Krauseola is a genus of flowering plants belonging to the family Caryophyllaceae.

It is native to Kenya, Mozambique and KwaZulu-Natal(in South Africa).

The genus name of Krauseola is in honour of Johannes Krause (1900–1979), a German botanist.

It was first described and published in H.G.A.Engler, Nat. Pflanzenfam. ed.2, 16c on page 308 in 1934.

Known species, according to Kew:
Krauseola gillettii 
Krauseola mosambicina

References

Caryophyllaceae
Caryophyllaceae genera
Plants described in 1934
Flora of Kenya
Flora of Mozambique
Flora of KwaZulu-Natal